In addition to the regular and recurring cast members of The Andy Griffith Show (1960–1968), the show had many guest stars. Some were known prior to their appearance, while others became well-known later.

Note: Episode titles are followed by the season and episode no., e.g. 2.24 means the 24th episode of the second season.

The Andy Griffith Show
Andy Griffith Show
Andy Griffith